The term mathematical program can refer to:
 A computer algebra system which is a computer program that manipulates mathematical entities symbolically
 Computer programs that manipulate numerical entities numerically, which are the subject of numerical analysis
 A problem formulation of an optimization problem in terms of an objective function and [[constraint (mathematics) (in this sense, a mathematical program is a specialized and now possibly misleading term that predates the invention of computer programming)